Agwanpur is a village panchayat in Barh subdivision in Patna district of Bihar, India.

Population
The population in Agwanpur panchayat was 8277 in 2001. Male population was 4383 and female population was 3894. Of these, 3401 were literate.

External links

Villages in Patna district